Markus Pittner (born 2 February 1967) is an Austrian wrestler. He competed in the men's Greco-Roman 68 kg at the 1988 Summer Olympics.

References

1967 births
Living people
Austrian male sport wrestlers
Olympic wrestlers of Austria
Wrestlers at the 1988 Summer Olympics
People from Feldkirch, Vorarlberg
Sportspeople from Vorarlberg